The State Natural History Museum in Braunschweig, Germany, is a zoology museum. It was founded in 1754.

Collections
The scientific collections include 3,000 mammal specimens, 50,000 bird specimens, 10,300 bird eggs, 4,000 skulls and skeletons,  and 1,000 fish, amphibian, and reptile specimens. Insects are represented by 80,000 Lepidoptera and 85,000 Coleoptera, and it has 100,000 mollusca  and 5,000 other fossils. The public displays include an aquarium, dioramas, and exhibitions of birds, mammals, insects, fossils, and meteorites.

See also 
List of museums in Germany
List of natural history museums

External links
Official site

Buildings and structures in Braunschweig
Culture in Braunschweig
Brunswick
Museums in Lower Saxony
Organisations based in Braunschweig
1754 establishments in the Holy Roman Empire